Cheshmeh-ye Ali Akbar (also Romanized as Cheshmeh-ye ‘Alī Akbar and Chesmeh-ye ‘Alī Akbar) is a village in Firuzabad Rural District, Firuzabad District, Selseleh County, Lorestan Province, Iran. At the 2006 census, its population was 263, in 50 families.

References 

ناام این روستا گلستان می باشد.
این روستا در کل دارای سه قسمت سنکر و چشمه علی اکبر و گلستان می باشد.
قسمت سنکر در بالای روستا و چشمه علی اکبر در وسط و گلستان در پایین روستا می باشد.

Towns and villages in Selseleh County